"All Quiet Along the Potomac," originally titled "The Picket Guard," is an 1861 poem by American writer Ethel Lynn Beers.

Overview
The poem was first published as "The Picket Guard" in the Harper's Weekly issue dated November 30, 1861. It attributed only to "E.B." It was reprinted broadly both with that attribution and without, leading to many spurious claims of authorship. Among those claiming authorship was Lamar Fontaine, then a private in the CSA. On July 4, 1863,  Harper's Weekly told its readers that the poem had been written for the paper by a lady contributor whom it later identified as Beers.

The poem was based on newspaper reports of "all is quiet tonight", which was based on official telegrams sent to the Secretary of War by Major-General George B. McClellan following the First Battle of Bull Run. In September 1861, Beers noticed that one report was followed by a small item telling of a picket being killed. She wrote the poem that same morning.

In 1863, the poem was set to music by John Hill Hewitt, himself a poet, newspaperman, and musician.  Sung by Efram Zimbalist Jr. in the Season 2 Episode 8 of the TV show "Maverick" entitled, "The Jail at Junction Flats".  This song may have inspired the title of the English translation of Erich Maria Remarque's World War I novel All Quiet on the Western Front.

"The Picket-Guard"

"The Picket-Guard", Harper's Weekly, 1861:
“All quiet along the Potomac,” they say,
“Except, now and then, a stray picket
Is shot as he walks on his beat to and fro,
By a rifleman hid in the thicket.
’Tis nothing—a private or two, now and then,
Will not count in the news of the battle ;
Not an officer lost—only one of the men
Moaning out, all alone, the death-rattle.”

All quiet along the Potomac to-night,
Where the soldiers lie peacefully dreaming ;
Their tents, in the rays of the clear autumn moon
Or the light of the watch-fire, are gleaming.
A tremulous sign, as the gentle night-wind
Through the forest-leaves softly is creeping ;
While stars up above, with their glittering eyes,
Keep guard—for the army is sleeping.

There’s only the sound of the lone sentry’s tread
As he tramps from the rock to the fountain,
And thinks of the two in the low trundle-bed
Far away in the cot on the mountain.
His musket falls slack—his face, dark and grim, 
Grows gentle with memories tender,
As he mutters a prayer for the children asleep—
For their mother—may Heaven defend her !

The moon seems to shine just as brightly as then,
That night when the love yet unspoken
Leaped up to his lips—when low-murmured vows
Were pledged to be ever unbroken.
Then drawing his sleeve roughly over his eyes,
He dashes off tears that are welling,
And gathers his gun closer up to its place,
As if to keep down the heart-swelling. 

He passes the fountain, the blasted pine-tree,
The footstep is lagging and weary ;
Yet onward he goes, through the broad belt of light,
Toward the shade of the forest so dreary.
Hark ! was it the night-wind that rustled the leaves ?
Was it moonlight so wondrously flashing ?
It looked like a rifle—  “ Ha ! Mary, good-by !”
And the life-blood is ebbing and plashing.

All quiet along the Potomac to-night,
No sound save the rush of the river ;
While soft falls the dew on the face of the dead—
The picket’s off duty forever !               E. B.

Illustrations

See also
 List of anti-war songs

References

Bibliography
Beers, Ethel Lynn. All Quiet Along the Potomac, and Other Poems. Philadelphia: Porter & Coates (1879).
Davidson, James Wood. The Living Writers of the South . New York: Carleton, Publisher (1869).
Fontaine, Lamar; J.H. Hewitt (m.). "All Quiet Along the Potomac To-night" (Sheet Music). Columbia, S.C.: Julian A. Selby (1863).
Graham, C.R. (ed.). Under Both Flags: A Panorama of the Great Civil War. Veteran Publishing Company (1896).
LaBree, Ben. Camp Fires of the Confederacy. Louisville, KY: Courier-Journal Job Printing Company (1898).
Matthews, Bander (ed.); N.C. Wyeth (illus.) Poems of American Patriotism. New York: Charles Scribner's Sons (1922).
Sargent, Epes (ed.). Harper's Cyclopaedia of British and American Poetry. New York: Harper & Brothers (1882).

External links
All Quiet Along the Potomac, and Other Poems (1879) at archive.org

Songs of the American Civil War
1863 songs
1861 poems
Songs based on poems
Works originally published in Harper's Weekly
Works published anonymously